= MIAC women's ice hockey tournament =

Minnesota Intercollegiate Athletic Conference women's ice hockey tournament
- Conference hockey championship
- Sport: Ice hockey
- Conference: MIAC
- Format: Two-game aggregate, Single-elimination
- Current stadium: Higher seed hosts, Neutral-site (2002,03)
- Played: 2000–Present
- Last contest: 2025
- Current champion: Augsburg
- Most championships: Gustavus Adolphus (13)

Many of the Minnesota Intercollegiate Athletic Conference (MIAC) schools developed club teams over the years, and eventually varsity hockey programs at the Division III level of the NCAA. Most of these varsity teams were established in the late 1990s. After Title IX gave equal access to women's sports, the MIAC, being one of the oldest conferences in the NCAA, finally had enough programs to offer women's ice hockey as a conference starting with the 1998–99 season. Six member programs began play at the time.

== History ==
In the 1998–99 season, the conference held a postseason tournament named the Augsburg invitational. This served as the first unofficial MIAC Championship.

In the 1999–00 season, the official MIAC women's ice hockey tournament was established to determine the postseason conference champion. With two more schools joining the MIAC, the top four teams qualified, with the higher seed hosting a two-game aggregate. The winner, would advance to the AWCHA Division III ice hockey championship to play a best-of-three series for the national championship. This was prior to the NCAA sponsoring Division III women's ice hockey.

In the 2001–02 season, the NCAA established a Division III Women's Ice Hockey Championship, of which the MIAC tournament champion received an automatic bid. The MIAC, now at ten teams, added a fifth team to their conference tournament. The new play-in game featured the 4th place team hosting the 5th place team, with the winner playing the #1 seed. The conference also eliminated the two-game aggregate model, moving towards a more traditional single-elimination style tournament. In the 2002 tournament, the semifinals and championship were held at a neutral site. The next season, in 2003, the entire tournament was held at a neutral site. From that point on, the MIAC tournament went back to the higher seed hosting through all rounds. This format stayed the same for years, with the only temporary adjustments coming because of the COVID-19 pandemic. After the 2020-21 tournament was cancelled due to the pandemic, the 2021-22 tournament was modified so that all ten teams qualified for the conference tournament. This was done so to allow all players the chance to play additional games after a few COVID cancellations bled into the 2021–22 season. This gave the top six teams in the standings a bye in a traditional ten-team bracket with no reseeding.

For the 2022-23 season, it was announced that the women's tournament would return to the traditional five-team field.

== 2000 ==
| Seed | School | Conference record |
|---|---|---|
| 1 | Augsburg | 12–1–1 |
| 2 | Saint Mary's | 12–1–1 |
| 3 | Gustavus Adolphus | 11–3–0 |
| 4 | Saint Benedict | 6–7–1 |

Semifinals; March 3–March 4
1 | Augsburg | 3 | 7 | 10
4 | Saint Benedict | 0 | 1 | 1
2 | Saint Mary's | 2 | 1 | 3
3 | Gustavus | 3 | 1* | 4

Championship; March 10-March 11
1 | Augsburg | 4 | 2 | 6
3 | Gustavus | 1 | 1 | 2

Note: * denotes overtime period(s)

== 2001 ==
| Seed | School | Conference record |
|---|---|---|
| 1 | Gustavus Adolphus | 16–2–0 |
| 2 | Saint Mary's | 15–3–0 |
| 3 | St. Thomas | 12–5–1 |
| 4 | St. Catherine | 11–6–1 |

Semifinals; February 23–24
1 | Gustavus | 6 | 8 | 14
4 | St. Catherine | 0 | 2 | 2
2 | Saint Mary's | 4 | 2 | 6
3 | St. Thomas | 1 | 0 | 1

Championship; March 2–3
1 | Gustavus | 4 | 1* | 5
2 | Saint Mary's | 2 | 1 | 3

Note: * denotes overtime period(s)

== 2002 ==
| Seed | School | Conference record |
|---|---|---|
| 1 | Gustavus Adolphus | 17–0–1 |
| 2 | Saint Mary's | 15–2–1 |
| 3 | St. Thomas | 12–3–3 |
| 4 | Concordia (MN) | 11–6–1 |
| 5 | Saint Benedict | 9–9–0 |

Play-in; February 26
4 | Concordia (MN) | 7
5 | Saint Benedict | 4

Semifinals: held in Blaine, MN; March 1
1 | Gustavus | 6
4 | Concordia (MN) | 2
2 | Saint Mary's | 5
3 | St. Thomas | 3

Championship: held in Blaine, MN; March 2
1 | Gustavus | 1
2 | Saint Mary's | 2

Note: * denotes overtime period(s)

== 2003 ==
| Seed | School | Conference record |
|---|---|---|
| 1 | St. Thomas | 14–2–2 |
| 2 | Concordia (MN) | 12–5–1 |
| 3 | Gustavus Adolphus | 11–4–3 |
| 4 | Saint Mary's | 10–4–4 |
| 5 | Augsburg | 10–6–2 |

Play-in: held in Woodbury, MN; February 27
4 | Saint Mary's | 2
5 | Augsburg | 1

Semifinals: held in Woodbury, MN; February 28
1 | St. Thomas | 1
4 | Saint Mary's | 0
2 | Concordia (MN) | 2
3 | Gustavus | 3

Championship: held in Woodbury, MN; March 1
1 | St. Thomas | 4
3 | Gustavus | 1

Note: * denotes overtime period(s)

== 2004 ==
| Seed | School | Conference record |
|---|---|---|
| 1 | St. Thomas | 16–1–1 |
| 2 | Gustavus Adolphus | 16–2–0 |
| 3 | St. Olaf | 11–7–0 |
| 4 | Saint Mary's | 11–7–0 |
| 5 | Augsburg | 10–6–2 |

Play-in; March 2
4 | Saint Mary's | 1
5 | Augsburg | 2

Semifinals; March 4
1 | St. Thomas | 6**
5 | Augsburg | 5
2 | Gustavus | 7
3 | St. Olaf | 0

Championship; March 6
1 | St. Thomas | 2
2 | Gustavus | 3

Note: * denotes overtime period(s)

== 2005 ==
| Seed | School | Conference record |
|---|---|---|
| 1 | Gustavus Adolphus | 17–1–0 |
| 2 | St. Thomas | 16–1–1 |
| 3 | St. Olaf | 13–4–1 |
| 4 | Augsburg | 10–7–1 |
| 5 | Saint Mary's | 7–8–3 |

Play-in; March 1
4 | Augsburg | 3
5 | Saint Mary's | 1

Semifinals; March 3
1 | Gustavus | 5
4 | Augsburg | 1
2 | St. Thomas | 8
3 | St. Olaf | 1

Championship; March 5
1 | Gustavus | 3**
2 | St. Thomas | 2

Note: * denotes overtime period(s)

== 2006 ==
| Seed | School | Conference record |
|---|---|---|
| 1 | Gustavus Adolphus | 17–0–1 |
| 2 | St. Thomas | 15–2–1 |
| 3 | Bethel | 10–7–1 |
| 4 | St. Olaf | 10–8–0 |
| 5 | Saint Mary's | 8–7–3 |

Play-in; February 28
4 | St. Olaf | 4
5 | Saint Mary's | 2

Semifinals; March 2
1 | Gustavus | 3
4 | St. Olaf | 1
2 | St. Thomas | 2
3 | Bethel | 1

Championship; March 4
1 | Gustavus | 2*
2 | St. Thomas | 1

Note: * denotes overtime period(s)

== 2007 ==
| Seed | School | Conference record |
|---|---|---|
| 1 | Gustavus Adolphus | 17–1–0 |
| 2 | St. Olaf | 12–5–1 |
| 3 | St. Thomas | 12–6–0 |
| 4 | Hamline | 10–6–2 |
| 5 | Saint Mary's | 9–7–2 |

Play-in; February 27
4 | Hamline | 4
5 | Saint Mary's | 2

Semifinals; March 2
1 | Gustavus | 4
4 | Hamline | 1
2 | St. Olaf | 2
3 | St. Thomas | 6

Championship; March 4
1 | Gustavus | 3
3 | St. Thomas | 2

Note: * denotes overtime period(s)

== 2008 ==
| Seed | School | Conference record |
|---|---|---|
| 1 | Gustavus Adolphus | 18–0–0 |
| 2 | St. Thomas | 14–4–0 |
| 3 | Concordia (MN) | 10–6–2 |
| 4 | Hamline | 8–7–3 |
| 5 | Bethel | 8–9–1 |

Play-in; February 28
4 | Hamline | 5
5 | Bethel | 2

Semifinals; March 1
1 | Gustavus | 5
4 | Hamline | 0
2 | St. Thomas | 4
3 | Concordia (MN) | 2

Championship; March 5
1 | Gustavus | 1
2 | St. Thomas | 0

Note: * denotes overtime period(s)

== 2009 ==
| Seed | School | Conference record |
|---|---|---|
| 1 | Gustavus Adolphus | 16–0–2 |
| 2 | St. Thomas | 14–2–2 |
| 3 | Bethel | 10–5–3 |
| 4 | Concordia (MN) | 7–7–4 |
| 5 | St. Olaf | 7–9–2 |

Play-in; February 26
4 | Concordia (MN) | 1
5 | St. Olaf | 2

Semifinals; February 28
1 | Gustavus | 5
5 | St. Olaf | 0
2 | St. Thomas | 3
3 | Bethel | 0

Championship; March 4
1 | Gustavus | 3
2 | St. Thomas | 0

Note: * denotes overtime period(s)

== 2010 ==
| Seed | School | Conference record |
|---|---|---|
| 1 | Gustavus Adolphus | 14–3–1 |
| 2 | St. Catherine | 13–3–2 |
| 3 | St. Thomas | 12–4–2 |
| 4 | Saint Mary's | 9–7–2 |
| 5 | St. Olaf | 9–7–2 |

Play-in; March 2
4 | Saint Mary's | 1
5 | St. Olaf | 3

Semifinals; March 4
1 | Gustavus | 5
5 | St. Olaf | 0
2 | St. Catherine | 4
3 | St. Thomas | 3

Championship; March 6
1 | Gustavus | 5
2 | St. Catherine | 1

Note: * denotes overtime period(s)

== 2011 ==
| Seed | School | Conference record |
|---|---|---|
| 1 | Gustavus Adolphus | 14–2–2 |
| 2 | St. Thomas | 10–4–4 |
| 3 | Bethel | 11–5–2 |
| 4 | St. Olaf | 11–5–2 |
| 5 | Concordia (MN) | 8–6–4 |

Play-in; March 1
4 | St. Olaf | 3
5 | Concordia (MN) | 4*

Semifinals; March 3
1 | Gustavus | 5
5 | Concordia (MN) | 2
2 | St. Thomas | 2
3 | Bethel | 4

Championship; March 5
1 | Gustavus | 3
3 | Bethel | 0

Note: * denotes overtime period(s)

== 2012 ==
| Seed | School | Conference record |
|---|---|---|
| 1 | Gustavus Adolphus | 16–1–1 |
| 2 | Concordia (MN) | 10–3–5 |
| 3 | St. Thomas | 11–6–1 |
| 4 | St. Olaf | 9–7–2 |
| 5 | Bethel | 9–7–2 |

Play-in; February 28
4 | St. Olaf | 4
5 | Bethel | 5*

Semifinals; March 1
1 | Gustavus | 1*
5 | Bethel | 0
2 | Concordia (MN) | 4
3 | St. Thomas | 1

Championship; March 3
1 | Gustavus | 4
2 | Concordia (MN) | 2

Note: * denotes overtime period(s)

== 2013 ==
| Seed | School | Conference record |
|---|---|---|
| 1 | Gustavus Adolphus | 18–0–0 |
| 2 | St. Thomas | 13–4–1 |
| 3 | Concordia (MN) | 11–4–3 |
| 4 | Bethel | 11–5–2 |
| 5 | St. Catherine | 8–7–3 |

Play-in; February 26
4 | Bethel | 3
5 | St. Catherine | 2

Semifinals; February 28
1 | Gustavus | 3
4 | Bethel | 2
2 | St. Thomas | 1
3 | Concordia (MN) | 2

Championship; March 2
1 | Gustavus | 4
3 | Concordia (MN) | 1

Note: * denotes overtime period(s)

== 2014 ==
| Seed | School | Conference record |
|---|---|---|
| 1 | St. Thomas | 14–2–2 |
| 2 | Gustavus Adolphus | 14–4–0 |
| 3 | Bethel | 13–5–0 |
| 4 | Concordia (MN) | 11–5–2 |
| 5 | St. Catherine | 8–9–1 |

Play-in; February 28
4 | Concordia (MN) | 2*
5 | St. Catherine | 1

Semifinals; March 1
1 | St. Thomas | 4*
4 | Concordia (MN) | 3
2 | Gustavus | 3
3 | Bethel | 2

Championship; March 8
1 | St. Thomas | 2
2 | Gustavus | 0

Note: * denotes overtime period(s)

== 2015 ==
| Seed | School | Conference record |
|---|---|---|
| 1 | Gustavus Adolphus | 15–2–1 |
| 2 | St. Thomas | 11–3–4 |
| 3 | Concordia (MN) | 9–6–3 |
| 4 | Saint Mary's | 9–7–2 |
| 5 | Bethel | 8–7–3 |

Play-in; February 26
4 | Saint Mary's | 1
5 | Bethel | 7

Semifinals; February 28
1 | Gustavus | 3
5 | Bethel | 6
2 | St. Thomas | 3
3 | Concordia (MN) | 2

Championship; March 7
5 | Bethel | 2
2 | St. Thomas | 3

Note: * denotes overtime period(s)

== 2016 ==
| Seed | School | Conference record |
|---|---|---|
| 1 | St. Thomas | 12–4–2 |
| 2 | Bethel | 12–4–2 |
| 3 | Augsburg | 10–5–3 |
| 4 | Concordia (MN) | 11–7–0 |
| 5 | Saint Mary's | 9–7–2 |

Play-in; February 25
4 | Concordia (MN) | 3
5 | Saint Mary's | 1

Semifinals; February 27
1 | St. Thomas | 2
4 | Concordia (MN) | 1
2 | Bethel | 1*
3 | Augsburg | 0

Championship; March 5
1 | St. Thomas | 2
2 | Bethel | 1

Note: * denotes overtime period(s)

== 2017 ==
| Seed | School | Conference record |
|---|---|---|
| 1 | Gustavus Adolphus | 13–2–3 |
| 2 | Augsburg | 14–4–0 |
| 3 | Concordia (MN) | 11–5–2 |
| 4 | St. Thomas | 9–5–4 |
| 5 | Hamline | 10–8–0 |

Play-in; February 24
4 | St. Thomas | 6
5 | Hamline | 1

Semifinals; February 25
1 | Gustavus | 2
4 | St. Thomas | 3*
2 | Augsburg | 3
3 | Concordia (MN) | 1

Championship; March 4
4 | St. Thomas | 3*
2 | Augsburg | 2

Note: * denotes overtime period(s)

== 2018 ==
| Seed | School | Conference record |
|---|---|---|
| 1 | Gustavus Adolphus | 13–2–3 |
| 2 | Hamline | 13–3–2 |
| 3 | Augsburg | 9–4–5 |
| 4 | Concordia (MN) | 6–7–5 |
| 5 | Bethel | 7–9–2 |

Play-in; February 22
4 | Concordia (MN) | 3
5 | Bethel | 4

Semifinals; February 24
1 | Gustavus | 4
5 | Bethel | 0
2 | Hamline | 4
3 | Augsburg | 1

Championship; March 3
1 | Gustavus | 1
2 | Hamline | 4

Note: * denotes overtime period(s), St. Thomas finished 2nd, ineligible for conference playoffs

== 2019 ==
| Seed | School | Conference record |
|---|---|---|
| 1 | St. Thomas | 15–1–1 |
| 2 | Hamline | 14–2–2 |
| 3 | Augsburg | 11–3–4 |
| 4 | Gustavus Adolphus | 11–3–4 |
| 5 | Saint Mary's | 6–8–4 |

Play-in; February 21
4 | Gustavus | 5
5 | Saint Mary's | 0

Semifinals; February 23
1 | St. Thomas | 4
4 | Gustavus | 0
2 | Hamline | 6
3 | Augsburg | 1

Championship; March 2
1 | St. Thomas | 2
2 | Hamline | 0

Note: * denotes overtime period(s)

== 2020 ==
| Seed | School | Conference record |
|---|---|---|
| 1 | Gustavus Adolphus | 15–1–2 |
| 2 | Hamline | 14–1–3 |
| 3 | Augsburg | 15–3–0 |
| 4 | St. Thomas | 11–6–1 |
| 5 | Saint Mary's | 6–10–2 |

Play-in; February 27
4 | St. Thomas | 1
5 | Saint Mary's | 4

Semifinals; February 29
1 | Gustavus | 4
5 | Saint Mary's | 1
2 | Hamline | 1
3 | Augsburg | 2*

Championship; March 7
1 | Gustavus | 3
3 | Augsburg | 0

Note: * denotes overtime period(s)

== 2021 ==
- Cancelled due to COVID-19 pandemic

== 2022 ==
| Seed | School | Conference record |
|---|---|---|
| 1 | Gustavus Adolphus | 13–1–2 |
| 2 | Hamline | 11–5–0 |
| 3 | Saint Mary's | 9–5–2 |
| 4 | St. Scholastica | 8–5–2 |
| 5 | Augsburg | 8–6–2 |
| 6 | Saint Benedict | 6–7–1 |
| 7 | Bethel | 5–6–2 |
| 8 | Concordia (MN) | 5–10–1 |
| 9 | St. Catherine | 4–12–0 |
| 10 | St. Olaf | 3–15–0 |

First Round; February 23
8 | Concordia (MN) | 1
9 | St. Catherine | 0
7 | Bethel | 3
10 | St. Olaf | 1

Quarterfinals; February 26
1 | Gustavus | 5
8 | Concordia (MN) | 1
4 | St. Scholastica | 6
5 | Augsburg | 3
2 | Hamline | 8
7 | Bethel | 0
3 | Saint Mary's | 5
6 | Saint Benedict | 3

Semifinals; March 2
1 | Gustavus | 5
4 | St. Scholastica | 0
2 | Hamline | 4
3 | Saint Mary's | 2

Final; March 5
1 | Gustavus | 6
2 | Hamline | 1

Note: * denotes overtime period(s)

== 2023 ==
| Seed | School | Conference record | Points |
|---|---|---|---|
| 1 | Gustavus Adolphus | 17–1–0 | 52 |
| 2 | Augsburg | 14–3–1 | 40 |
| 3 | Saint Benedict | 11–7–0 | 33 |
| 4 | St. Olaf | 10–7–1 | 30 |
| 5 | Hamline | 8–9–1 | 25 |

Play-in; February 24
4 | St. Olaf | 1
5 | Hamline | 2*

Semifinals; February 25-26
1 | Gustavus | 5
5 | Hamline | 1
2 | Augsburg | 5
3 | Saint Benedict | 2

Championship; March 4
1 | Gustavus | 4
2 | Augsburg | 2

Note: * denotes overtime period(s)

== 2024 ==
| Seed | School | Conference record | Points |
|---|---|---|---|
| 1 | Gustavus Adolphus | 17–1–0 | 52 |
| 2 | Augsburg | 15–3–0 | 42 |
| 3 | Saint Mary's | 12–4–2 | 38 |
| 4 | Hamline | 13–5–0 | 38 |
| 5 | Bethel | 8–9–1 | 26 |

Play-in; February 21
4 | Hamline | 0
5 | Bethel | 1

Semifinals; February 24
1 | Gustavus | 2*
5 | Bethel | 1
2 | Augsburg | 1
3 | Saint Mary's | 2

Championship; March 2
1 | Gustavus | 2
3 | Saint Mary's | 0

Note: * denotes overtime period(s)

== 2025 ==
| Seed | School | Conference record | Points |
|---|---|---|---|
| 1 | Augsburg | 16–2–0 | 48 |
| 2 | Gustavus Adolphus | 15–3–0 | 44 |
| 3 | Hamline | 11–7–0 | 35 |
| 4 | Saint Mary's | 10–8–0 | 31 |
| 5 | St. Olaf | 9–8–1 | 28 |

Play-in; February 26
4 | Saint Mary's | 3
5 | St. Olaf | 2

Semifinals; March 1
1 | Augsburg | 3****
4 | Saint Mary's | 2
2 | Gustavus | 4
3 | Hamline | 0

Championship; March 8
1 | Augsburg | 3*
2 | Gustavus | 2

Note: * denotes overtime period(s)

== Championships by school ==
| School | Championships | Title Years | Conf. Tourn. Appearances |
|---|---|---|---|
| Gustavus Adolphus | 15 | 2001, 2004, 2005, 2006, 2007, 2008, 2009, 2010, 2011, 2012, 2013, 2020, 2022, 2023, 2024 | 24 |
| St. Thomas (Note: St. Thomas exited the MIAC in the 2021-22 school year and was replaced with St. Scholastica) | 6 | 2003, 2014, 2015, 2016, 2017, 2019 | 19 |
| Augsburg | 2 | 2000, 2025 | 13 |
| Saint Mary's | 1 | 2002 | 16 |
| Hamline | 1 | 2018 | 10 |
| Saint Benedict | 1 | 2026 | 4 |
| Concordia (MN) | 0 | | 13 |
| Bethel | 0 | | 12 |
| St. Olaf | 0 | | 11 |
| St. Catherine | 0 | | 5 |
| St. Scholastica | 0 | | 1 |
